Children of the Whirlwind is a 1925 American silent crime drama film directed by Whitman Bennett and starring Lionel Barrymore, Johnnie Walker, and Marguerite De La Motte.

Plot
As described in a film magazine review, a young man freshly released from Sing Sing goes straight with the help of a friendly artist, but his old gang, including his sweetheart, accuse him of informing and plan to blackmail his benefactor. The young woman’s father, a convict pal of the younger man, the father of his sweetheart, is released from prison also and determines to kill one of the crooks, whom he paid to keep the young woman straight. However, the turn of events sets aright the affairs of everyone excepting those who refused to reform.

Cast

References

Bibliography
 Munden, Kenneth White. The American Film Institute Catalog of Motion Pictures Produced in the United States, Part 1. University of California Press, 1997.

External links

1925 films
1925 crime drama films
American crime drama films
Films directed by Whitman Bennett
American silent feature films
American black-and-white films
Arrow Film Corporation films
1920s English-language films
1920s American films
Silent American drama films